Liv Cooke (born 20 April 1999) is a British freestyle football world champion, and current six-time world record holder. She was also a BBC Sport presenter on the prime-time show 'MOTDx' and UEFA ambassador, who has previously been awarded the Parliamentary Rising Star and Woman of the Future awards. Although best known for her freestyle football and social media videos, Cooke is also the founder of Liv Cooke Holdings Ltd., a group which encompasses Liv Cooke Properties Ltd., W1NFLUENCE Ltd., and Liv Cooke Ltd..

Biography
Cooke started playing football at a young age having grown up with her two older brothers, Jack and Sam.

At the age of 10 she joined Preston North End F.C. whilst also playing in Woodlea Junior School's football team. Cooke went on to study at Balshaw's Church of England High School, where she captained the girls' football team, and signed for the Blackburn Rovers F.C. Centre of Excellence at the age of 14.

One year later, Cooke was side-lined by a recurring back injury and discovered freestyle football videos online. She began to learn the basics in her back garden and stopped playing football in 2015 to focus on freestyle. In 2016, at the age of 17, Cooke left Runshaw College early to pursue a career as a professional football freestyler.

Since becoming a professional freestyler, Cooke has diversified her career through social media and TV, ambassadorial roles, and founding several companies.

Career 
In 2015, Cooke performed freestyle publicly for the first time at St Andrews Infant School in her local town of Leyland, Lancashire. This was quickly followed by her first professional event, where she performed at a Blackburn Rovers half-time show at Ewood Park. Since then, Cooke has become the youngest ever professional football freestyler, performing at events across the globe and working with a number of major organisations.

Her work has included performing at Qatar’s national sports day, becoming an ambassador for the UEFA ‘We Play Strong’ initiative designed to get more girls into football, and touring Australia to inspire children to get active. Commercially, Cooke has featured in a Channel 4 TV commercial, a number of Adidas commercials, and a LIDL advert. In addition, she has appeared on a number of TV shows including Match of the Day, Soccer AM, BBC and Fox Soccer News.

Cooke made her competitive freestyle debut in London in August 2016 at the Red Bull Street Style World Finals, where she placed 6th and was the youngest qualifier. Later that year, Cooke qualified for the 2016 World Football Freestyle Championships in Melbourne. She finished second, making her the youngest ever finalist. Cooke broke her foot in the final, which ruled her out for several months. She returned to training in April 2017. In August 2017, Cooke qualified for the 2017 Super Ball open football freestyle championships in Prague. Once there, she won all of her battles to become the world football freestyle champion and the youngest in history to ever take the title.

In 2018, Cooke became an ambassador for UEFA Women's Football, launching her own social media-based series 'Play Anywhere'. In 2019, Cooke became a global ambassador for UEFA Euro 2020.

In September 2019, Cooke signed as a BBC Sport presenter. This role included hosting the new MOTDx show, along with presenting features on Match of the Day.

In September 2021 Cooke had to pull out of the Soccer Aid line-up due to contracting Covid-19.

In September 2021, Cooke was confirmed as the highest earning female athlete TikTok creator at that time.

In October 2021, Cooke appeared on CBBC show Saturday Mash Up, where she was gunged with 20 buckets of slime after losing out in a vote against singer Nathan Evans.

In May 2022, Cooke was announced as the Boston Red Sox Wild Card for the inaugural Home Run Derby X in 2022, participating in the series across London, Seoul, and New Mexico. 

In August 2022, Cooke appeared alongside various other athletes and celebrities in the Sport Relief All Star Games, which aired shortly after the conclusion of the 2022 Commonwealth Games in Birmingham.

Liv Cooke Holdings Ltd. 
Cooke is the founder of Liv Cooke Holdings Ltd,(there is no official record of this company in the UK) a group which encompasses three companies that she has founded and wholly-owns: W1NFLUENCE Ltd., Liv Cooke Properties Ltd., and Liv Cooke Ltd.. 

In May 2016, Cooke founded Girls ATW, which went on to become the world's leading female football freestyle agency. Although successful, Cooke folded the company in 2017 as she focused on training for the World Championships. Cooke subsequently re-branded in 2019 as W1NFLUENCE, which Cooke now uses as a platform for innovation; she designs, produces, and distributes freestyle-specific footballs and other gadgets to assist with freestyle football on the move, with all profits re-invested into supporting grassroots football. 

In November 2019 Cooke founded Liv Cooke Properties Ltd., a company focused on residential real estate developments and investments. Her work on developments has also extended to advising on the development of the £2.6m South Ribble Playing Pitch Hub at Bamber Bridge Leisure Centre, which includes two new 3G pitches. 

In April 2020 Cooke founded Liv Cooke Ltd..

See also 
 Freestyle football
 World Freestyle Football Association
 Ricardo Chahini

References

External links
 W1NFLUENCE official website

1999 births
Living people
Freestyle footballers
British founders